The All-Ireland Club Finals may refer to:
All-Ireland Senior Club Football Championship
All-Ireland Senior Club Hurling Championship
All-Ireland Senior Club Camogie Championship